Xocavar may refer to:
Binə Xocavar, Azerbaijan
Böyük Xocavar, Azerbaijan